Marinara is a 2004 Philippine television drama fantasy comedy series broadcast by GMA Network. Directed by Enrico Quizon and Soxy Topacio, it stars Rufa Mae Quinto in the title role. It premiered on June 21, 2004 on the network's Telebabad line up replacing Twin Hearts. The series concluded on October 1, 2004 with a total of 75 episodes.

Cast and characters

Lead cast
 Rufa Mae Quinto as Marie / Dolphina / Aira

Supporting cast
 Wendell Ramos as Luis Iñigo
 Alfred Vargas as Felipe
 Angel Aquino as Oceana
 Ronaldo Valdez as Juan Miguel
 Daria Ramirez as Lelay
 Melanie Marquez as Zadama
 Gladys Reyes as Tara
 Mel Martinez as Syoque
 Sherilyn Reyes as Arwana
 Gene Padilla as Pogito
 Vangie Labalan as Pinang
 Julianne Lee as Ayel
 Zack Togezaki as JM
 Jess Lapid, Jr. as Alvaro

Guest cast
 Eddie Garcia as Karfa
 Michael V. as fake Aira / Freddie Gil
 Rudy Fernandez as Daboy
 Janno Gibbs as young Juan Miguel
 K Brosas as Sushi Lou
 Tess Bomb as Flordetuna
 Patricia Ysmael as Lordilis
 Diego Llorico as Dikoy
 Rudy Hatfield as Rudy

References

External links
 

2004 Philippine television series debuts
2004 Philippine television series endings
Fantaserye and telefantasya
Filipino-language television shows
GMA Network drama series
Mermaids in television
Television shows set in the Philippines